The 2021 European Amputee Football Championship was the second edition of the international competition of amputee football national men's teams. It was organized by the European Amputee Football Federation (EAFF), and was held in Kraków Poland between September 12–19, 2021. Turkey won the title for the second time, defeating Spain in the final. Poland became bronze medalist before Russia.

Participating nations
Following 14 nations competed in four groups.

Preliminary round

Group A

Group B

Group C

Group D

Knockout stage

Positions 9-14

Positions 9-14

13th place

Positions 9-12

11th place

9th place

Quarter-finals

Quarter-finals

Positions 5-8

7th place

5th place

Semi-finals

3rd place

Final

Rankings

Awards
Top goalscorer:  Ömer Güleryüz (11 goals)
Best goalkeeper:  Luis Ribeiro Medina
Most valuable player:  Ömer Güleryüz
Fair Play:  Greece

References

External links
2021 - European Amputee Football Championship

European international sports competitions
Men's sports competitions in Europe
International association football competitions hosted by Poland
2021 in disability sport
Amputee
Sports competitions in Kraków
2021 in association football
2021
European Amputee Football Championship
Sports events postponed due to the COVID-19 pandemic